As You Please is the third studio album by American rock band Citizen. The album was released on October 6, 2017 through Run for Cover Records. On October 24, 2018, Citizen uploaded a song that was not used on the album, "Open Your Heart", through the Run For Cover Records YouTube channel. In May 2018, the group embarked on a co-headlining US tour with Basement; they were supported by Pronoun and Souvenirs.

Critical reception 

As You Please was well-received by most contemporary music critics. On review aggregator website, Metacritic, which normalizes music ratings, As You Please received an average score of 77 out of 100, indicating "generally favorable reviews based on 9 critics".

Track listing

Charts

References

External links 
 
 As You Please at Genius
 
As You Please at Run for Cover Records
 As You Please on Spotify

2017 albums
Citizen (band) albums
Run for Cover Records albums
Albums produced by Will Yip